The Bonanza Range is a small mountain range on Vancouver Island, British Columbia, Canada, located in the area between the Nimpkish River and the Tsitika River. It has an area of 150 km2 and is a subrange of the Vancouver Island Ranges which in turn form part of the Insular Mountains.

See also
List of mountain ranges

References

External links
 

Vancouver Island Ranges
Mountain ranges of British Columbia